Mitchell Shire was a local government area in the Riverina region of New South Wales, Australia.

Mitchell Shire was proclaimed on 7 March 1906, one of 134 shires created after the passing of the Local Government (Shires) Act 1905. 

The shire office was in Wagga Wagga. Towns and villages in the shire include Currawarna, Collingullie and Uranquinty. 

Mitchell Shire was abolished on 1 January 1981 and, along with Kyeamba Shire, its area was absorbed into the City of Wagga Wagga per the Local Government Areas Amalgamation Act 1980.

References

Former local government areas of New South Wales
1906 establishments in Australia
1981 disestablishments in Australia